David Onuoha is an Anglican bishop in Nigeria.

Onuoha is the current Bishop of Okigwe South and was elected Archbishop of the Province of Owerri in 2020.

He was enthroned as Bishop of Okigwe South in 2004.

Notes

Living people
Anglican bishops of Okigwe South
21st-century Anglican bishops in Nigeria
21st-century Anglican archbishops
Anglican archbishops of Owerri
Year of birth missing (living people)